The 2021–22 Basketball Championship of Bosnia and Herzegovina was 21st season of this championship, with 14 teams from Bosnia and Herzegovina participating in it. HKK Široki  is the defending champion.

Competition format 
Thirteen of fourteen teams joined the regular season, playing with as double round-robin tournament.

The first five teams joined "Liga 6" along with KK Igokea. 
The last three teams should had been relegated, however KK Bosna and KK Zrinjski remained in the league.

Playoffs will not be played and team which ends on first place in Liga 6 will be the champion.

Distribution 
The following is the access list for this season.

Teams and locations

Pre-season controversy 
In June 2021, at the end of the 2020-21 season, Igokea, Borac and Spars did not show up to the final tournament due to the disagreements with competition system and schedule.  As a result, the title was awarded to Široki as a walkover and Igokea, Borac and Spars were fined, and initially relegated to a lower-tier competition.
On 5 October 2021 the drew was held with 11 participating teams. The championship officially began on October 16, but three matches were cancelled because teams from Republika Srpska boycotted the competition because of board's decisions made in June.

On 19 October the board of the league after appeals decided that Igokea, Borac and Spars will be fined, but not relegated. New draw was held and competition continued with 14 teams instead of 11.

Promotion and relegation 
Radnik Bijeljina and Posušje were promoted, while Kakanj was relegated. Čapljina Lasta withdrew due to the financial difficulties.

Regular season

Standings

Liga 6

Clubs in European competitions

References 

Basketball Championship of Bosnia and Herzegovina
Bosnia
Bas